The 2003 World Music Awards (15th annual World Music Awards) were held on 12 October 2003 in Monaco. Awards are given based on worldwide sales figures for that year. Big winners of the night was 50 Cent, who took home four awards and t.A.T.u. with three awards winning.

Winners
 Pink
 Eminem
 Robbie Williams
 Samira Said
 Dido
 Avril Lavigne
 Do
 Patrick Bruel
 Lorie
 Yannis Kotsiras
 Eros Ramazzotti
 Laura Pausini
 Panjabi MC
 Ronan Keating
 Enya
 Herbert Grönemeyer
 Roxette
 DJ Bobo

Chopard Diamond Award
The Chopard Diamond award (or simply the Diamond award) is given by the World Music Awards to artists who have sold over 100 million albums during their career. This award is occasionally confused with the previously created RIAA certification of "Diamond," which represents the sale of over ten million copies of an album in the U.S., and was created in 1999, whereas the Chopard Diamond award was created in 2001.
Mariah Carey

Act of 2003
World's Best Selling Artist of the year: 50 Cent

Pop
World's Best Selling Pop Male Artist: 50 Cent
World's Best Selling Pop Female Artist: Norah Jones
World's Best Selling Pop Group Artist: t.A.T.u.

Pop/Rock
World's Best Selling Pop/Rock Artist: Eminem

Rock
World's Best Selling Rock Group: Linkin Park

Dance
World's Best Selling Dance Artist: Justin Timberlake
World's Best Selling Dance Group: t.A.T.u.

Adult
World's Best Selling Adult Contemporary Artist: Norah Jones

R&B
World's Best Selling R&B Artist: 50 Cent

Rap/Hip-Hop
World's Best Selling Rap/Hip-Hop Artist: 50 Cent

Latin
World's Best Selling Latin female artist: Shakira
World's Best Selling Latin male artist: David Bisbal

Duo
World's Best Selling Duo: t.A.T.u.

New
World's Best Selling New Artist: 50 Cent

National Awards
World's Best American Female Artist: Pink
World's Best American Male Artist: Eminem 
World's Best British Male Artist: Robbie Williams
World's Best British Female Artist: Dido
World's Best Canadian Artist: Avril Lavigne
World's Best Chinese Artist ：Nicholas Tse
World's Best Dutch Artist: Do
World's Best French Male Artist: Patrick Bruel
World's Best French Female Artist: Lorie
World's Best Greek Artist: Yannis Kotsiras
World's Best Italian Male Artist: Eros Ramazzotti
World's Best Italian Female Artist: Laura Pausini
World's Best Indian Artist: Panjabi MC
World's Best Irish Male Artist: Ronan Keating
World's Best Irish Female Artist: Enya
World's Best German Artist: Herbert Grönemeyer
World's Best Middle Eastern Artist: Samira Said
World's Best Scandinavian Artist: Roxette
World's Best Swiss Artist: DJ Bobo

External links
http://www.billboard.biz/bbbiz/search/article_display.jsp?vnu_content_id=2000704
https://www.billboard.com/articles/news/68677/2003-world-music-awards-winners

World Music Awards, 2003
Lists of World Music Award winners